The 10th Islamic Consultative Assembly was the 34th Parliament of Iran that commenced on 28 May 2016 following the legislative elections on 26 February and 29 April 2016 and ended on 26 May 2020.

According to Anoushiravan Ehteshami, three things make this parliament noteworthy: return of the reformists to the parliamentary arena, a record of 17 seats held by female lawmakers and the fact that only 26% of the incumbent MPs were re-elected in the elections, making it a less experienced parliament.

Parliamentary groups 
The parliament has three main parliamentary groups: 

The reformist Hope fraction is the largest bloc by number, however it is unable to form a partnership with a great number of newcomers and independents who owe little allegiance to any particular faction. Instead, the conservative allies of Hassan Rouhani led by Ali Larijani have effectively mobilized them. It was clearly illustrated when Mohammad Reza Aref declined to stand for the speaker and Larijani was re-elected uncontested with 237 out of 276 votes.

Members

References